David Perno is the former head baseball coach at the University of Georgia. In 11 seasons he compiled a record of 384-329-1. He led the program to five NCAA tournaments, including three College World Series. He was named the 2004 Coach of the Year by Baseball America. That same year, he won his first SEC championship. His 2006 team went 47–23, but the next year, however, they went 23–33. In 2008, his team did much better, going 45–25–1 (20–9–1 SEC) and won his second SEC championship. That one tie was at LSU due to an SEC travel curfew. He was named the SEC coach of the year and was the national runner-up to the Fresno State Bulldogs at the College World Series. He is a former player and assistant coach at Georgia. Two players suffered paralyzing injuries — Chance Veazey in a scooter accident and Jonathan Taylor in a game — in a span of less than two years from 2009 to 2011. He was dismissed by UGA Athletic Director Greg McGarity after the 2013 season.

In December 2015, Perno was named head football coach at his alma mater, Clarke Central High School in Athens, Georgia, where he won a state title as a player in 1985 and played for another in 1984.

Head coaching record

College baseball

References

1967 births
Living people
Baseball players from Georgia (U.S. state)
Georgia Bulldogs baseball coaches
Georgia Bulldogs baseball players
Georgia Bulldogs football players
Middle Georgia Warriors baseball players
Marshall Thundering Herd baseball coaches
Marshall University alumni
Middle Georgia Warriors baseball coaches
High school football coaches in Georgia (U.S. state)
Sportspeople from Athens, Georgia
Baseball players from Youngstown, Ohio